The Midstates Four is a Barbershop quartet that won the 1949 SPEBSQSA international competition.

References
AIC entry (archived)
Mid States Four Quartet info in Singers.com

Barbershop quartets
Barbershop Harmony Society